Hyland Highway is a road connecting the towns of Traralgon and Yarram in the Gippsland region of Victoria, Australia. The highway was named after Sir Herbert Hyland, a popular politician for the Country Party in the Gippsland area.

Route
Highland Highway starts at the intersection of Princes Street and Breed Street, heading south as a dual-lane, single-carriageway road, nearly immediately crossing the Bairnsdale railway line just east of Morwell railway station, then heads east after a roundabout, then after another kilometre turns south to leave Traralgon's suburbs, curving around Loy Yang's open-cut coal mine, then heads south through Gormandale, through the eastern stretches of the Strzelecki Ranges, to eventually end at the intersection with South Gippsland Highway, 2 kilometres north-east of Yarram.

History
The road was originally known as Yarram-Traralgon Road and declared a Main Road by the Country Roads Board (later VicRoads) from at least 1955.

The construction of the open-cut coal mine for Loy Yang Power Station in the late 1970s required the road to be re-routed along Traralgon Creek Road (west of the coal mine) and Bartons Lane (south of the coal mine); the former alignment is now known as Craigburn Place (to the mine's north) and Broomfields Lane (to the mine's south-east).

The passing of the Transport Act of 1983 (itself an evolution from the original Highways and Vehicles Act of 1924) provided for the declaration of State Highways, roads two-thirds financed by the State government through the Road Construction Authority (later VicRoads). The Hyland Highway was declared a State Highway in December 1990, from Traralgon to Yarram; before this declaration, the road was referred to as Traralgon Creek Road and Yarram-Traralgon Road.

Hyland Highway was signed as State Route 188 between Traralgon and Yarram in 1990; with Victoria's conversion to the newer alphanumeric system in the late 1990s, it was replaced by route C482.

The passing of the Road Management Act 2004 granted the responsibility of overall management and development of Victoria's major arterial roads to VicRoads: in 2004, VicRoads re-declared the road as Hyland Highway (Arterial #6170), beginning at Princes Highway at Traralgon and ending at South Gippsland Highway in Yarram.

Major intersections

See also

 Highways in Australia
 Highways in Victoria

References

Highways in Victoria (Australia)